The 1971 Toledo Rockets football team was an American football team that represented the University of Toledo in the Mid-American Conference (MAC) during the 1971 NCAA University Division football season. In their first season under head coach Jack Murphy, the Rockets compiled a 12–0 record, outscored all opponents by a combined total of 383 to 96, and won the Mid-American Conference (MAC) championship. The season ended with a 28–3 victory over Southern Conference champion Richmond in the 1970 Tangerine Bowl.  The Rockets were ranked No. 14 in the final AP Poll and No. 13 in the final UPI Poll.

The 1971 season was part of a 35-game winning streak that consisted of three consecutive seasons from 1969 through 1971. During the streak, Toledo won three consecutive MAC championships and three consecutive bowl games, led the nation in total defense all three years, and outscored opponents by a combined total of 1,152 to 344.  It remains the second longest winning streak in modern Division I-A college football history behind Oklahoma's 47-game streak in the 1950s.  The defense led the way for the 1971 team, allowing only 164.6 total yards per game, a figure which remains a school record.

Quarterback Chuck Ealey, who had led Toledo to all three undefeated seasons, finished eighth in the 1971 Heisman Trophy voting with 168 points. Ealey was also selected as a first-team All-American by the Football Writers Association of America (FWAA) and Football News. For the third consecutive year, Ealey was also named the MAC Back of the Year. For the second consecutive year, he received the Jim Nicholson Award as the player contributing the most to the team's success.

Defensive tackle Mel Long was a consensus All-American, receiving first-team honors from the Associated Press, FWAA, Newspaper Enterprise Association, and United Press International. Long was the first consensus All-American in MAC history. Long was also named MAC Lineman of the Year for the second consecutive year.

Five Toledo players received first-team All-MAC honors: Chuck Ealey, Mel Long, tailback Joe Schwartz, end Don Fair, tight end Al Baker, defensive end Bob Rose, linebacker John Niezgoda, and defensive backs Gary Hinkson and John Saunders. The team captains were Ealey, Long and Hinkson.

The team's statistical leaders included Chuck Ealey with 1,821 passing yards, Joe Schwartz with 1,130 rushing yards and 120 points scored, Don Fair with 773 receiving yards, and John Niezgoda with 178 tackles.

Jack Murphy had been an assistant coach at Toledo under Frank Lauterbur.  After Lauterbur resigned in December 1970 to become head football coach at Iowa, Murphy was named as the new head coach.  In his first year as Toledo's head coach, Murphy was named MAC Coach of the Year.

The Rockets played their home game in the Glass Bowl. The attendance at five home games was 98,360, an average of 19,672 per game.

Schedule

Roster

References

Toledo
Toledo Rockets football seasons
Mid-American Conference football champion seasons
Citrus Bowl champion seasons
College football undefeated seasons
Toledo Rockets football